"Nobody Else but You" is a song by American singer Trey Songz, released as the lead single from Tremaine the Album, on February 12, 2017.

Composition
"Nobody Else but You" was written by Songz and produced by Isaak. On the song he addresses a woman, trying to deny the rumors about him that describe him as an incurable womanizer who cannot be trusted, saying that she is the only woman he loves.

Critical reception
Revolt's Maurita Salkey complimented its lyrics, saying that "the singer rarely sounded this romantic". John Kennedy of Vibe said that in the song "[h]e redeems himself [...] staring in the mirror wondering why he takes his relationship for granted". Maeve Mcdermott of USA Today said that the song was a right choice as the lead single of the album, defining it as a "bubbly lead single".

Charts

Certifications

References

2017 singles
2017 songs
Atlantic Records singles
Songs written by Trey Songz
Trey Songz songs